The Round Barn, Pilot Grove Township is an historical building located in rural Montgomery County, Iowa, United States. It was built in 1912 as a general purpose barn. The building is a true round barn that measures  in diameter. It is the type that was promoted by the Illinois Agricultural Experiment Station. The barn is covered in white vertical siding and features a two-pitch roof, a small dormer on the south side and an  central silo. It has been listed on the National Register of Historic Places since 1986.

References

Infrastructure completed in 1912
Buildings and structures in Montgomery County, Iowa
National Register of Historic Places in Montgomery County, Iowa
Barns on the National Register of Historic Places in Iowa
Round barns in Iowa